Harish Khanna is an Indian politician belonging to Aam Admi Party. He won as an M.L.A from Timarpur constituency in Delhi as an AAP Member.

References

Aam Aadmi Party politicians
Delhi MLAs 2013–2015
Living people
Punjabi people
Punjabi Hindus
Year of birth missing (living people)
Place of birth missing (living people)
Delhi politicians